The Serfs is a satirical play by Ivan Cankar; the Slovene title is .

Backstory 
In 1907, an election took place in Austro-Hungary. After the clerical-conservative victory, Cankar, a renowned Slovenian writer and playwright, wrote this play condemning the "serevants" that the people are; naming them "serfs".

Censure 
The play was censured by the Austro-Hungarian government over strikes regarding over 60 points in the text. Thus, the play was first conducted in 1919.

References

External links

Slovene-language books
Slovene-language plays
Ivan Cankar